Ascozonus is a genus of fungi in the Thelebolaceae family.

References

External links
Index Fungorum

Leotiomycetes